San Jose and Santa Ynez station is a light rail stop on the Muni Metro J Church line, located in the Mission Terrace neighborhood of San Francisco, California adjacent to Balboa Park. The station has two short side platforms in the middle of San Jose Avenue (traffic islands) located before the intersection in each direction where passengers board or depart from trains. The station is not accessible to people with disabilities.

The stop is also served by the  route which provides service along the J Church line during the early morning when trains do not operate.

J Church and N Judah trains began using the extension of the J Church line along San Jose Avenue for carhouse moves on August 31, 1991. Although these trips were open to passengers, the extension and its stops did not open for full-time service until June 19, 1993.

In March 2014, Muni released details of the proposed implementation of their Transit Effectiveness Project (later rebranded MuniForward), which included a variety of stop changes for the J Church line. The inbound platform at Santa Ynez, currently less than the length of a single Muni Metro car, would be extended.

References

External links 

SFMTA: San Jose Ave & Santa Ynez Ave inbound and outbound
SF Bay Transit (unofficial): San Jose Ave & Santa Ynez Ave

Muni Metro stations
Railway stations in the United States opened in 1991